The interdental papilla, also known as the interdental gingiva, is the part of the gums (gingiva) that exists coronal to the free gingival margin on the buccal and lingual surfaces of the teeth. The interdental papillae fill in the area between the teeth apical to their contact areas to prevent food impaction; they assume a conical shape for the anterior teeth and a blunted shape buccolingually for the posterior teeth.

A missing papilla is often visible as a small triangular gap between adjacent teeth. The relationship of interdental bone to the interproximal contact point between adjacent teeth is a determining factor in whether the interdental papilla will be present. If greater than 8mm exist between the interdental bone and the interproximal contact, usually no papilla will be present. If the distance is 5mm or less, then a papilla will almost always be present.

With active periodontal disease, both the marginal gingiva and attached gingiva can become enlarged, especially the interdental papillae. This enlargement results from edema occurring in the lamina propria of the tissue caused by the inflammatory response.

References 

Gingiva